The Samoa women's national field hockey team represents Samoa in international field hockey competitions and is controlled by the Western Samoa Hockey Association.

Results

Oceania Cup
2009 – 
2013 – 
2015 –

Hockey World League
2012–13 – First round
2014–15 – First round

Pacific Games
2003 – 
2007 –

See also

Fiji men's national field hockey team

References

Oceanian women's national field hockey teams
Field hockey
National team
Women's sport in Samoa